Naam is a 1953 Indian Tamil-language film directed by A. Kasilingam, starring M. G. Ramachandran and V. N. Janaki. It is based on Kaadhal Kanneer, a novel by Kashi. The film was released on 5 March 1953 and failed commercially.

Plot 
Kumaran is the heir to a zamindari estate, which he learns from his dying mother. However, the will and the related testament are hidden by Malayappan. A doctor Sanjeevi is also interested in the property and wants his daughter to marry Kumaran. Against his wishes, Kumaran is in love with Malayappan's sister Meena. When Meena gets the will, Kumaran suspects her intentions, and leaves the village. In the city, he becomes a boxer. Meanwhile, Malayappan sets Kumaran's house on fire and Kumaran is presumed dead. However, he is saved by Meena. More complications arise about the missing will, and simultaneously, a disfigured boxer moves around at night, leading to rumours about a ghost in the village. However, the truth is eventually revealed, and the lovers are united.

Cast 
 M. G. Ramachandran as Kumaran
 V. N. Janaki as Meena
 P. S. Veerappa as Malayappan
 M. N. Nambiar
 M. G. Chakrapani as Sanjeevi
 P. K. Saraswathi as Sanjeevi's daughter
 S. R. Janaki
 R. M. Sethupathi
 S. M. Thirupathisami
 T.M. Gopal
 M. Jayashree
 A. C. Irusappan
 Sandow M. M. A. Chinnappa Thevar

Production 
Naam was jointly produced by Jupiter Pictures and Mekala Pictures. Joint partners of Mekala Pictures, a new venture in movie production, then included M. Karunanidhi, M.G. Chakrapani, M.G. Ramachandran, P.S.Veerappa and A. Kasilingam. M. Karunanidhi wrote the screenplay, dialogue and lyrics, based on Kaadhal Kanneer, a novel by Kashi. M. G. Ramachandran, then not the popular icon that he would later become, spelt his name onscreen as "Ramachandar" because he thought it sounded "stylish", and wanted to differentiate himself from the already established actor T. R. Ramachandran.

Soundtrack 
The music was composed by C. S. Jayaraman, while lyrics written by M. Karunanidhi.

Release 
Naam was released on  5 March 1953, and failed commercially.

References

External links 
 

1953 films
1950s Tamil-language films
Films with screenplays by M. Karunanidhi
Films based on Indian novels
Jupiter Pictures films
Indian boxing films